The Port of Skagen, also Skagen Harbour, is located in Skagen, northern Denmark. The country's leading fishing port consists of an industrial harbour that supports the area's fishing industry as well as facilities for cruise ships. It also has a shipyard and fish-processing facilities. The harbour's marina is open to visitors during the summer months.

The fishing harbour was built between 1904 and 1907, with inner and outer sections established under the supervision of hydraulic engineer Palle Bruun. The official inauguration was on 20 November 1907. The distinctive warehouses next to the harbour were designed by Thorvald Bindesbøll, and opened in May 1908. In 1932, on the occasion of the harbour's 25th anniversary, Anne Marie Carl-Nielsen's statue of the fisherman and lifeboatman was unveiled. Between 1964 and 1979 the harbour was further expanded towards the east in a 35 million kr project to facilitate growth at the port, doubling the size of the harbour and providing new facilities for auctioning the catches from the 400 fishing boats registered in Skagen.

The Skagen Port Authority is responsible for the harbour's administration. FF Skagen, one of three companies supporting the Danish fish meal industry, has its processing plant on Skagen wharf. The harbour is being adapted to accommodate large international cruise ships. A new  berth to be completed by 2015 will also provide facilities for oil bunkering and enhanced facilities for the fishing industry.

Description

The Port of Skagen is situated in Ålbæk Bugt (Ålbæk Bay). The harbour consists of three main basins (docks with water levels controlled by flood gates): Ydre Forhavnsbassin, Vesthavn and Østhavn. The Vesthavn consists of Indre Forhavnsbassin, Bundgarnsbassin, Auktionsbassin, Mellembassin and Vestre Bassin, while the Østhavn consists of Østbassin I and Østbassin II. Skagen Lystbådehavn (Skagen's pleasure boat harbour) administers the area between Gamle Pier and Pier 2 in the Mellembassin.

The Lystbådehavn (marina) between Piers 1 and 2 is open to visiting pleasure boats from 1 April to 30 September. While the Port of Skagen supervises the marina during the summer months, the facilities are used for berthing fishing boats in the off-season. Frederikshavn Municipality is the official administrator. Facilities on Pier 1 include a diesel fuelling station at the end the pier and a barbecue. There is also a service building with toilets, showers, washing machines and dryers. Wifi internet access is available throughout the marina.

History

Early history and background
After years of discussion between Skagen's fishermen and the authorities, a commission was finally established in the 1880s, leading to an early proposal for a harbour by Customs Inspector Holm that was not accepted. Under pressure from the fishermen, the Minister of the Interior called on an engineer by the name of Berg to prepare a new proposal in 1888. This led to parliamentary approval on 23 April 1903, followed by a call for tenders on 26 January 1904. On the basis of a bid from Gunnarson & Søn og Elzelingen, work was initiated  in February 1904 on Skagen's Sønderstand (south shore) just outside the town. The work was supervised by the hydraulic engineer Palle Bruun who had reported on harbours in the Faroe Islands.

A harbour-master's house, fish warehouse and a customs office were built in parallel. On 19 November 1907, King Frederik VIII ceremonially opened the port in the presence of the Skagen Painters, who had decorated the facilities with flags. Carl Locher had designed an impressive gateway of honour.

In May 1908, four fish warehouses on the quayside designed by Thorvald Bindesbøll were opened. In 1932, on the occasion of the harbour's 25th anniversary, Anne Marie Carl-Nielsen's statue of the fisherman and lifeboatman was unveiled.

Post-war developments

In 1943, the Rigsdag approved 7 million kr proposals to further expand the harbour towards the west. However, due to the German occupation during the war the project was postponed and it wasn't until 1952 that construction began, rising to a budget of 11 million kr. Between 1964 and 1979, the harbour was further expanded towards the east in a 35 million kr project to facilitate growth at the port, doubling the size of the harbour and providing new facilities for auctioning the catches from the 400 fishing boats registered in Skagen. The off-shore area was enlarged by 14 hectares and the on-shore area with 120 hectares. A new auction room was erected between the fisheries inspection building and the auction office.

In 2001, the Port of Skagen acquired autonomously governed harbour status, after the government sold off several of the national harbours. Additional facilities for fish processing, including a refrigeration plant, were completed in 2008.

Fishing

The Port of Skagen is Denmark's largest fishing port and the first in Europe for landings of pelagic fish, primarily herring. Founded in 1960, FF Skagen is one of three companies supporting the Danish fish-meal industry; its processing plant is located on Skagen wharf. As of 2011, statistics from the Danish Fisheries Directorate list Skagen Harbour as the leading fishing port in Denmark in terms of both the quantity of catches and their value. Statistics for 2013 from NaturErhvervstyrelsen showed a year-on-year increase in fishing takings of 10 percent for a total value of DKK 3.4 billion (c. US $621 million). Harbour director Willy Bent Hansen reported that the Port of Skagen now represented over 25 percent of all fish landed in Denmark.

In April 2014, the 86-meter-long supertrawler "Gitte Henning" landed a record 3,281 tons of whiting in Skagen after returning from its maiden voyage, apparently the largest catch ever in Denmark.

Recent developments
The harbour is currently being adapted to accommodate large international cruise ships. On the shipbuilding front, Karstensens Skibsværft continues to prosper with orders for trawlers from Norway. There are also plans for establishing oil-bunkering facilities for large vessels on the outer section of the new port.

In July 2014, Berlingske reported that from 2015 the enlarged harbour was expected to attract up to 40 large cruise ships per year compared to only a dozen smaller ships at present. The larger vessels will carry up to 3,500 passengers. Port of Skagen was covering the cost of the work which amounted to DKK 226 million (US$41 million). The new harbour would provide new jobs increasing the workforce from some 2,000 today to 2,600 on completion. Karstens Skibsværft, Danish Yacht, and the herring processing firm, Skagerrak Pelgic, were reported to be the most successful companies in Skagen but the town was also home to FF Skagen, the world's top producer of fish meal and fish oil.

References

Bibliography

External links

 Official website
 Current details of shipping in and around Port of Skagen

Skagen
Skagen
Transport in the North Jutland Region
1907 establishments in Denmark